Events from the year 1724 in Ireland

Incumbent
Monarch: George I

Events
March – Jonathan Swift publishes the first of the Drapier's Letters (A Letter To the Shop-Keepers, Tradesmen, Farmers, and Common-People of Ireland, Concerning the Brass Half-Pence Coined by Mr. Woods).
22 May – a total solar eclipse crosses Ireland around 6:30 p.m.

Births

March 24 – Richard Hamilton, 4th Viscount Boyne, politician (d. 1789)
October 20 – Thomas Taylour, 1st Earl of Bective, politician (d. 1795)
Samuel Derrick, hack writer (d. 1769 in England)
John Hely, later Hely-Hutchinson, lawyer and statesman (d. 1794)
John Pomeroy, British Army officer (d. 1790)
Frances Sheridan, novelist and playwright (d. 1766)
1724 or 1725 – Arthur Guinness, brewer (d. 1803)
Approximate date
Robert Blakeney, politician (d. 1762)
Frances Greville née Macartney, poet (d. 1789)
Samuel Clossy anatomist (d. 1786)

Deaths
February 10 or 1723 – Henry Colley, politician (b. c.1685)
November – Liam an Dúna Mac Cairteáin, poet and soldier (b. 1668)
John Barnwell, colonist in the Province of South Carolina (b. 1671)
Approximate date – Proinsias Ó Doibhlin, poet and priest.

References

 
Years of the 18th century in Ireland
Ireland
1720s in Ireland